The Gift is a 30-minute made-for-television movie directed by Laura Dern and starring Jason Adelman, Bonnie Bedelia, Peter Horton, Diane Ladd, Isabella Rossellini and Mary Steenburgen.  It is about a woman trying to cope with the prospect of breaking up with her longtime partner and moving on with her life.

Home Media 
The film was released on DVD in Australia in "Perverse Destiny, Volume 2" with three other short films:
Texan (1994), starring Dana Delaney, written by David Mamet
Little Surprises (1995), directed by Jeff Goldblum
Museum of Love (1996), starring and directed by Christian Slater

External links

1994 television films
1994 films
American television films
1994 short films
American short films